The 2016–17 George Washington Colonials men's basketball team represented George Washington University during the 2016–17 NCAA Division I men's basketball season. The Colonials were led by interim head coach Maurice Joseph. They played their home games at the Charles E. Smith Center in Washington, D.C. as members of the Atlantic 10 Conference.

Head coach Mike Lonergan was fired on September 17, 2016, after the school concluded a two-month investigation into alleged emotional abuse against his players. Maurice Joseph was named interim head coach on September 27.

They finished the regular season 20–15, 10–8 in A-10 play to finish in sixth place. They defeated Saint Louis in the second round of the A-10 tournament before losing in the quarterfinals to Richmond. They were invited to the College Basketball Invitational where they defeated Toledo in the first round before losing in the quarterfinals to UIC.

On March 27, 2017, the school removed the interim tag and named Joseph full-time head coach.

Previous season
The Colonials finished the 2015–16 season with a record of 28–10, 11–7 in A–10 play to finish in fifth place. In the A–10 Tournament, the Colonials defeated Saint Louis before losing to Saint Joseph's in the quarterfinals. The Colonials received a bid to the National Invitation Tournament and defeated Hofstra, Monmouth, and Florida to advance to the NIT semifinals at Madison Square Garden. There, they defeated San Diego State by 20 points to advance to the championship game. In the championships game, the Colonials defeated Valparaiso 76–60 to win the NIT Championship.

Offseason

Departures

Incoming transfers

2016 recruiting class

Roster

Schedule and results

|-
!colspan=9 style=| Japanese exhibition tour

|-
!colspan=12 style=| Exhibition

|-
!colspan=12 style=| Non-conference regular season

|-
!colspan=12 style=| Atlantic 10 regular season

|-
!colspan=12 style=| Atlantic 10 tournament

|-
!colspan=12 style=| College Basketball Invitational

See also
 2016–17 George Washington Colonials women's basketball team

References

George Washington Colonials men's basketball seasons
George Washington
George Washington